482nd or 482d may refer to:

482d Bombardment Squadron, an inactive United States Air Force unit
482d Fighter Wing, a unit of the United States Air Force assigned to the Air Force Reserve Command
482d Fighter-Interceptor Squadron, an inactive United States Air Force unit
482d Operations Group, a United States Air Force Reserve unit assigned to the 482d Fighter Wing

See also
482 (number)
482, the year 482 (CDLXXXII) of the Julian calendar
482 BC